Kenny is the eighth studio album by Kenny Rogers, released in 1979. It includes the singles "Coward of the County" and "You Decorated My Life."

"Tulsa Turnaround" is a reworking of an earlier song Rogers recorded with The First Edition.

"Goodbye Marie" was first recorded by Johnny Rodriguez on his March 1979 album, Rodriguez Was Here, and then later recorded by Bobby Goldsboro, charting as a single for him in 1981.

The album reached the top five of the US Billboard album chart and #1 in the Country charts (where it stayed for a record total of 25 weeks). In the UK, it was a top ten album as well. In 2007, the album was issued as a two album set on one CD, the other album included on the disc being the self-titled Kenny Rogers from 1976.

In the sleeve notes for the 2009 reissue on the Edsel record label, biographer Chris Bolton notes that this album "does its best to represent every musical personality of Kenny Rogers." Stephen Thomas Erlewine states that the album mixes music styles from Country to Disco.

This was the fourth of twelve #1's for Rogers on the Country albums chart, as well as his first Top 10 'Pop' album entry.

Track listing

Personnel
 Kenny Rogers – lead vocals
 Bobby Wood, Chuck Cochran, David Briggs, Edgar Struble, Gene Golden, Hargus "Pig" Robbins, Larry Keith, Shane Keister – piano
 Edgar Struble – clavinet, synthesizers
 Billy Sanford, Dave Kirby, Jerry Shook, Jimmy Capps, Johnny Christopher, Larry Keith, Randy Dorman, Ray Edenton, Reggie Young, Tommy Allsup, Rick Harper, Steve Glassmeyer – guitars
 Bobby Thompson – banjo
 Charles "Chuck" Jacob, Joe Osborn – bass guitar
 Bob Moore – upright bass
 Bobby Daniels – drums
 Farrell Morris – percussion
 Steve Glassmeyer – saxophone
 Sheldon Kurland Strings – strings
 Bill Justis, Edgar Struble (track 10) – string arrangements
 Bergen White, Bobby Daniels, Buzz Cason, Don Gant, Donna McElroy, Edgar Struble, Lea Jane Berinati, Steve Glassmeyer, Todd Cerney, Tom Brannon, Yvonne Hodges – backing vocals

Production
 Producer, Mixing – Larry Butler
 Engineers – Billy Sherrill (Tracks 1, 2, 4–8, 10 & 11); Harold Lee (Tracks 3 & 9).
 Recorded at American Studios and Jack Clements Recording Studios (Nashville, TN).
 Mastered by Bob Sowell at Master Control (Nashville, TN).
 Artwork – Bill Burks
 Photography – Reid Miles

Chart performance

Certifications

References

Kenny Rogers albums
1979 albums
Albums arranged by Bill Justis
Albums produced by Larry Butler (producer)
United Artists Records albums